Mohan Murjani is the Chairman of the Murjani group. He has developed, launched and built brands including Gloria Vanderbilt, Tommy Hilfiger and most recently, Vanderbilt New York.

Career
Born in India, raised in Hong Kong and educated in the UK and US, Murjani joined the family business in 1966, founded by his father, the late B.K. Murjani.  In 1930, the Murjani Group moved from retailing in Shanghai, to apparel manufacturing in Hong Kong with an annual production of 10 million units.  In 1966, the Group launched its first brand in the United States, "Marco Polo", culminating in 1975 with the launch of the designer jeans brand Gloria Vanderbilt and Tommy Hilfiger in 1985.

In 1992, under the provisions of the UK Insolvency Act 1986, Murjani was declared bankrupt, with Rothman Pantall & Co. appointed as his bankruptcy trusties.

In 2004, the Murjani group launched Tommy Hilfiger in India in addition to other brands, including Gucci, Jimmy Choo, Bottega Veneta, Calvin Klein and French Connection. In 2007, the Murjani group built India’s first luxury mall, The Galleria, in Mumbai.

References

External links
Murjani Group
http://indiatoday.intoday.in/story/mohan-murjani-the-man-who-made-gloria-vanderbilt-and-himself-an-overnight-empire/1/409684.html
http://www.business-standard.com/article/opinion/lunch-with-bs-mohan-murjani-108040801040_1.html

Year of birth missing (living people)
Living people
Indian business executives
20th-century Indian businesspeople
21st-century Indian businesspeople